The 2014 Oceania Sevens Championship was the seventh Oceania Sevens in men's rugby sevens. It was held in Noosa, Australia.

Fiji won the Oceania Sevens Championship by defeating New Zealand 21-5. The two best-placed non-core Sevens World Series teams qualified through to the 2015 Wellington Sevens (Papua New Guinea) and the 2015 Hong Kong Sevens (Tonga).

Pool Stage

Pool A

Pool B

Pool C

Knockout stage

Bowl

Plate

Cup

Final standings

References

2014
2014 in Australian rugby union
2014 rugby sevens competitions
Sport in the Sunshine Coast, Queensland
Rugby sevens competitions in Australia
International rugby union competitions hosted by Australia
2014 in Oceanian rugby union